The Minister of Finance is an appointment in the Cabinet of Sri Lanka. The post was created in 1947 when Ceylon gained independence as Sri Lanka.

History 
The position of Treasurer of Ceylon of the British Government of Ceylon dates back to the early nineteenth century and was succeeded by the post of Financial Secretary of Ceylon under the recommendations of the Donoughmore Commission. The post of Ministry of Finance and the Treasury of Ceylon was established in 1947 under the recommendations of the Soulbury Commission under the Ceylon Independence Act, 1947 and The Ceylon (Constitution and Independence) Orders in Council 1947. A young J.R Jayawardena, became the first Minister of Finance of independence Ceylon. Over time the Ministry took over the policy planning which it currently undertakes.

Beginning 4 April 2022, Ali Sabry was appointed as the new minister, replacing Basil Rajapaksa (brother of President Gotabaya Rajapaksa) in the position; However, due to the worsening of the financial crisis, Sabry tendered his resignation 5 April 2022, having served only a day in office; However, Sabry later decided to continue serving in the capacity of finance minister.

Prime Minister Ranil Wickremesinghe was appointed finance minister by President Gotabaya Rajapaksa. Upon assuming the Presidency himself, Wickremesinghe remained Finance Minister.

List of Finance Ministers

Parties
 (10)
 (9)
 (1)
 (3)

List of Parliamentary secretaries
Sir Herbert Eric Jansz 17.05.1948  10.09.1950
Louis Lucien Hunter	20.09.1950	02.04.1952
Louis Lucien Hunter	02.06.1952	29.04.1953
M. D. H. Jayawardena	19.10.1953	01.07.1954
U. B. Wanninayake	01.07.1954	27.04.1955
Chandradasa Wijesinghe	25.04.1956	10.09.1958
Nimal Karunatilake	18.11.1958	19.05.1959
Meeralebbe Poddy Mohamed Mustapha	25.06.1959	22.11.1959
Dayasena Pasqual    22.11.1959      05.12.1959
George Rajapaksa	29.07.1960	20.06.1962
R. S. V. Poulier	28.08.1962	06.05.1963
Mudiyanse Tennakoon	30.05.1963	12.03.1964
James Peter Obeyesekere III	22.06.1964	17.12.1964
Noel Wimalasena	29.03.1965	25.03.1970

Deputy ministers
Neal de Alwis	01.10.1975	04.02.1977
Festus Perera	23.07.1977	05.02.1978
M. H. M. Naina Marikar	06.02.1978	19.01.1988
J A E Amaratunga	19.01.1988	09.01.1989
Harold Herath	18.02.1989	28.03.1999
Harold Herath	30.03.1990	15.08.1994
Jeyaraj Fernandopulle	01.09.1994	12.11.1994
G. L. Peiris	24.11.1994	09.08.2000
G. L. Peiris	16.08.2000	10.10.2000
G. L. Peiris	25.11.2000	13.09.2001
S. B. Dissanayake	25.11.2000	13.09.2001
Mangala Samaraweera	14.09.2001	07.12.2001
Bandula Gunawardane	12.12.2001	07.02.2004
Ranjith Siyambalapitiya	14.04.2004	26.04.2010
Sarath Amunugama	17.01.2009	26.04.2010
Chandrasiri Gajadeera	27.04.2010	21.11.2010
Sarath Amunugama	10.05.2010	21.11.2010
Gitanjana Gunawardena	26.11.2010 - 2015
Ajith Nivard Cabraal 2020 - 2021

See also
 Ministry of Finance, Economic Stabilization and National Policies

References

External links
 List of Ministers and Deputy Ministers
 Government of Sri Lanka
 

 
Finance, Economic Stabilization and National Policies